The 2008 Bronze Helmet (BK) is the 2008 version of Bronze Helmet organized by the Polish Motor Union (PZM). It is unofficial Individual U-19 Polish Championship.

The Final took place on September 26, 2008, in Gdańsk.

Calendar

Semi-finals

Final 
Final
2008-09-26 (18:00)
 Gdańsk
Referee: Józef Piekarski (Toruń)
Attendance:
Beat Time:
Change:
(17) Przemysław Pawlicki (LES) → Szymon Kiełbasa (TAR) → Mateusz Kowalczyk (CZE)

See also 
 2008 Individual Speedway Junior European Championship
 2008 Individual Speedway Junior Polish Championship

References 

2008
Helmet Bronze